The discography of East 17, a British boy band, consists of six studio albums, four compilation albums, and twenty-three singles.

The band's debut album, Walthamstow, shot to No. 1 on the UK Albums Chart. It featured a string of Top 20 singles, including "House of Love" and "Deep". "It's Alright" became a major success in Australia, reaching No. 1 in early 1994 for 7 weeks in a row and No. 3 in the UK in 1993.

In 1994, upon the release of their second album, Steam, East 17 scored their only UK number-one single with "Stay Another Day". Their next album, Up All Night, was released in 1995. In 1996, the group hit No. 2 with the track "If You Ever", a duet with Gabrielle. They split up in 1997.

In 1998, East 17 was renamed E-17 and released the single "Each Time", which reached No. 2 in the UK. Their next single, "Betcha Can't Wait", went to number 12, but their album Resurrection failed to make the UK top 40. The band was again dropped by their label in 1999 and split for the second time.

In 2011, East 17 released their first single since 1999, titled "Secret of My Life", followed by "I Can't Get You Off My Mind (Crazy)" and its parent album, Dark Light, released in 2012.

In 2017, East 17 released their sixth studio album, 24/7, exclusively in Australia. It was released internationally in 2021.

Albums

Studio albums

Compilation albums

Singles

Home videos

Music videos

References

Discographies of British artists
Pop music group discographies
East 17